Shadrino is the name of several rural localities in Russia:
Shadrino, Kalmansky District, Altai Krai, a selo in Shadrinsky Selsoviet of Kalmansky District, Altai Krai
Shadrino, Amur Oblast, a selo in Chesnokovsky Selsoviet of Mikhaylovsky District, Amur Oblast